Samuel Pearson (born 26 October 2001) is a Welsh professional footballer who plays as a midfielder for AFC Wimbledon on loan from Bristol City.

Career
On 6 March 2021, Pearson made his debut for Bristol City in the Championship as a substitute in a 2–0 defeat against Queens Park Rangers.

On 21 January 2022, Pearson joined Scottish Championship side Inverness Caledonian Thistle on loan for the remainder of the 2021–22 season. He left the club on 1 April 2022 due to a family bereavement and returned to his parent club.

On 28 July 2022, Pearson joined National League side Yeovil Town on an initial one-month loan deal. On 24 August, the loan spell was extended until January 2023. In January 2023, Pearson joined League Two club AFC Wimbledon on loan until the end of the season.

Career statistics

References

2001 births
Living people
Footballers from Cardiff
Welsh footballers
Wales youth international footballers
Wales under-21 international footballers
Association football midfielders
Bristol City F.C. players
Bath City F.C. players
Weymouth F.C. players
Inverness Caledonian Thistle F.C. players
Yeovil Town F.C. players
AFC Wimbledon players
English Football League players
Scottish Professional Football League players
National League (English football) players